Guerci is an Italian surname. Notable people with the surname include:

Alex Guerci (born 1989), Italian footballer
Mario Guerci (1913–?), Argentine rower
Paolo Guerci, Italian engineer who has spent his career in auto racing, active late 1970s to the present

Italian-language surnames